Eohomopterus is a genus of beetles in the family Carabidae, containing the following species:

 Eohomopterus aequatoriensis (Wasmann, 1899)
 Eohomopterus centenarius Luna de Carvalho, 1960
 Eohomopterus poinari Nagel, 1997
 Eohomopterus simojovelensis Solorzano & Kraemer, 2006

References

Paussinae